"We Don't Need Another Hero (Thunderdome)" is a song written by Graham Lyle and Terry Britten, and recorded by American singer Tina Turner. It appeared in the 1985 film Mad Max Beyond Thunderdome, which starred Mel Gibson and Turner. On the heels of Turner's multi-platinum record Private Dancer (1984), the song was released as a 7-inch single, an extended version was released as a 12-inch single and on the film's soundtrack album. In the United Kingdom, a shaped picture disc was also issued. The power ballad received a Golden Globe Award nomination for Best Original Song and a Grammy Award nomination for Best Female Pop Vocal Performance. As songwriters, Lyle and Britten received the Ivor Novello Award for Best Song Musically and Lyrically.

Recording 
Turner was backed by a choral group from King's House School in Richmond, London. One of the choir members who appeared on the recording, Lawrence Dallaglio, became famous as a rugby union star and captain of the England national team.

Chart performance 
"We Don't Need Another Hero (Thunderdome)" became one of Turner's biggest hit singles. It peaked at number two on the US Billboard Hot 100, behind only John Parr's "St. Elmo's Fire (Man in Motion)". It also reached number three in the United Kingdom and reached number one in Australia, Canada, Germany, Poland, Spain, Switzerland and West Germany.

Music video 
The accompanying music video for "We Don't Need Another Hero (Thunderdome)" features Turner dressed in her Aunty Entity costume from the Mad Max film, a heavy chain mail gown. As several spotlights shine on her, she proceeds to sing atop a platform while various scenes from the movie are interspersed. In the last portion of the video, Turner is accompanied by a children's choir and Tim Cappello, her tour saxophonist, percussionist and keyboardist at the time. The music video received an MTV Video Music Award nomination for Best Female Video.

Official versions/remixes
 Single Version – 4:16
 7" Instrumental – 4:41
 12" Extended Mix (Soundtrack Album Version) – 6:07
 12" Dub Mix (Soundtrack Instrumental Version) – 6:30

Charts

Weekly charts

Year-end charts

Certifications and sales

Cover versions 
In 2004, Canadian singer Jane Child recorded a cover of the song, titling it "Beyond Thunderdome (We Don't Need Another Hero)" for the album What's Love? A Tribute to Tina Turner.

In 2007, Finnish supergroup Northern Kings covered the song on their debut album Reborn.

In March 2016, Seal and Jencarlos Canela performed a cover of the song during the Fox television special The Passion. It was sung in the story where Pontius Pilate (Seal) is torn at sentencing Jesus (Jencarlos) to death; the lyrics were amended to remove the reference to Thunderdome, which was replaced with "the love we know".

In March 2023, Rita Ora recorded a cover of the song for Apple Music Home Sessions.

References 

1985 singles
1985 songs
Film theme songs
Tina Turner songs
Number-one singles in Germany
Number-one singles in Switzerland
Number-one singles in Australia
RPM Top Singles number-one singles
Mad Max music
Songs written by Graham Lyle
Songs written by Terry Britten
Songs written for films
Rock ballads
1980s ballads
Pop ballads
Capitol Records singles